Denholme railway station was a station on the Keighley-Queensbury section of the Queensbury Lines which ran between Keighley, Bradford and Halifax via Queensbury.

History
The station was built by the Great Northern Railway in 1884, almost  from the town of Denholme, West Yorkshire, England. By road, the station was accessed by an unlit and downhill road (Station Road) from the village. The station had an island platform which was accessed by a long iron footbridge which spanned the down tracks. The site also housed a goods yard, with stone-built shed, stables, and numerous sidings - with coal and timber being the principal traffic, as evident from photographs of the site whilst it was still in operation. The station master's house (Station House) was built adjacent to and overlooking the site. There were railway tunnels at either end of the site.

The station closed to passengers on 23 May 1955 along with the rest of the line from Keighley to Queensbury. It remained open for goods traffic - predominantly timber - until 1961. The site was then purchased by a timber merchant and converted to a large timber yard. The timber yard closed in 2012 and the site is now (2016) vacant, but with outline planning permission for a small housing estate. Station House is still standing, having been converted to a private residence.

References

External links
 Denholme station on navigable 1947 O. S. map

Disused railway stations in Bradford
Former Great Northern Railway stations
Railway stations in Great Britain opened in 1884
Railway stations in Great Britain closed in 1955
Denholme